Changshou Lu Station is a station on Line 1 of the Guangzhou Metro that began operations on June28, 1999. It is situated underground at the junction of Changshou Road West and Baohua Road in Guangzhou's Liwan District, near the Shangxiajiu shopping area.

Station layout

References

Railway stations in China opened in 1999
Guangzhou Metro stations in Liwan District